In enzymology, a 2-dehydro-3-deoxygalactonokinase is an enzyme that catalyzes the chemical reaction

ATP + 2-dehydro-3-deoxy-D-galactonate  ADP + 2-dehydro-3-deoxy-D-galactonate 6-phosphate

Thus, the two substrates of this enzyme are ATP and 2-dehydro-3-deoxy-D-galactonate, whereas its two products are ADP and 2-dehydro-3-deoxy-D-galactonate 6-phosphate.

This enzyme belongs to the family of transferases, specifically those transferring phosphorus-containing groups (phosphotransferases) with an alcohol group as acceptor.  The systematic name of this enzyme class is ATP:2-dehydro-3-deoxy-D-galactonate 6-phosphotransferase. Other names in common use include 2-keto-3-deoxygalactonokinase, 2-keto-3-deoxygalactonate kinase (phosphorylating), and 2-oxo-3-deoxygalactonate kinase.  This enzyme participates in galactose metabolism.

References

 

EC 2.7.1
Enzymes of unknown structure